Menculik Miyabi (Indonesian for Kidnapping Miyabi) is a 2010 Indonesian comedy film directed by Findo Purwono HW and produced by Ody Mulya Hidayat. Starring Sabrina Pai and Nicky Tirta, the film follows a young man who is obsessed with AV idol Maria Ozawa and, in an attempt to kidnap her, accidentally kidnaps a Taiwanese tourist. After the film was announced it was protested heavily by the Islamic Defenders Front, which resulted in Ozawa's role being cut almost entirely. Critical reception was unfavourable.

Plot
Following a contest, Miyabi (Maria Ozawa as herself) is asked to deliver a prize, consisting of a pair of airplane tickets, to Jakarta, Indonesia. Excited by the prospect, she begins learning about Indonesia. However, when she attempts to board her flight she discovers that she has forgotten her passport at home and is thus stuck in Tokyo.

Meanwhile, in Jakarta, Kevin (Nicky Tirta) and his friends Bimo (Kevin Julio) and Aan (Hardi Fadhillah) are being terrorised by Mike and his flunky. Mike bets the trio that they will be unable to find a beautiful woman to bring to his girlfriend Jessica's (Herfiza Novianti) birthday party. Seeing Mike's childish behaviour towards the trio of "losers", Jessica – Kevin's childhood friend – breaks up with Mike on their way home.

At Kevin's home, Aan discovers that Miyabi is scheduled to come to Indonesia and has the trio go to Soekarno-Hatta Airport to see her. They join a crowd of Miyabi fans and, when a woman resembling Miyabi leaves the entry gate, the group of fans chases after her. Kevin and his friends force her into their car, while Aan silently takes her passport. After a series of misunderstandings caused by language barriers, the girl realises that her passport is missing. When Kevin and his friends take her to the Japanese embassy they discover that the girl, Mie Yao Bie (Sabrina Pai), is from Taiwan. The boys plan to have her spend the three days required to make a new passport at Kevin's house. Mie Yao Bie, although at first disgusted with the boys, grows to like them – although they remain unable to communicate verbally.

Later that day Jessica comes to Kevin's home, asking to use his internet connection to send an email. Kevin assists her, and after almost sharing a kiss Jessica invites him to see a movie with her. This date, however, is interrupted when Mie Yao Bie arrives, calls for Kevin, and gives him an enthusiastic hug upon finding him. Jessica declares Kevin to be the same as all other men and leaves him alone in the theatre. The following day, when Kevin tries to give her flowers to make amends, Mike steals his flowers and gives them to Jessica.

Before the party Kevin discovers that Aan has been hiding Mie Yao Bie's passport and, after fighting with Aan, gives it back to her. Aan thereafter decides to go to the party on his own but is humiliated, forced to drink alcohol while dressed only in his boxers. Kevin, having decided to stand up for himself and win Jessica's love, arrives with Bimo and beats Mike in a fight. Mike states that Kevin had still lost their bet, as he had not brought any girls with him. Mie Yao Bie then arrives with her Taiwanese friends and kisses each of the trio on the cheek. Enraged, Mike departs.

Jessica, after hearing the whole story, forgives Kevin; they begin dating and share a kiss. Some days later, Miyabi arrives in Jakarta and – owing to a mishap with apartment numbers – delivers the prize to Bimo. Bimo, however, is unaware that she is Miyabi and treats her as a courier.

Production
Menculik Miyabi was directed by Findo Purwono HW and produced by Ody Mulya Hidayat of Maxima Pictures. The script was written by Bang Marqee; blogger-cum-novelist Raditya Dika was reportedly attached, but denied any connection owing in part to fears that his young readers would attempt to learn of Ozawa and her pornography. Cinematography was handled by Joel F Zola, while editing was completed by the Waldo Brothers. Music was provided by Joseph S Djafar, with Abdul Malik Deva and Bellamy on sound. The film starred Sabrina Pai, Nicky Tirta, Herfiza Novianti, Kevin Julio Chandra, and Hardi Fadhillah.

The film was initially meant to star Maria Ozawa, who was cast for the part at great expense. Commonly billed as Miyabi in Indonesia, Ozawa was a Eurasian AV idol from Japan who had become famous in 2005. As an AV idol she had acted in numerous pornographic films. For Menculik Miyabi she would have performed no nude scenes. However, as she had been a pornographic actress the hardline Islamic Defenders Front (or FPI) protested the production. A spokesman said that the group was "ready to die fighting" to prevent Ozawa's arrival; in other protests students burned women's underwear. Ultimately the Ministry of Culture and Tourism banned Ozawa from coming to Indonesia, and plans for her to film in Indonesia were dropped. She ultimately filmed several scenes in Japan, although she had reduced prominence in the final edit.

Release and reception
Menculik Miyabi was released on 6 May 2010. The Indonesian Ulema Council protested its contents, while the FPI threatened to raid theatres showing the film. Otherwise the release proved uneventful. It saw mediocre box-office returns.

Marcel Thee, reviewing for The Jakarta Globe, found the film "another dud in a collection of tedious local comedies" which focused on "not particularly funny sex jokes and an equally hollow love story". Benny Benke of the Semarang-based Suara Merdeka, found the film's elements to be "unrelated" ("tidak terkait"), with the title serving only as a draw for male audiences.

Ozawa would later star in another Indonesian production, the horror film Hantu Tanah Kusir (Ghost of Tanah Kusir), in 2010. This film was also made by Maxima Pictures.

Footnotes

Works cited

External links

2010 comedy films
2010 films
Films shot in Indonesia
Films shot in Tokyo
Indonesian comedy films
Films directed by Findo Purwono HW